Freixiosa is a freguesia in Mangualde, Portugal. The population in 2011 was 257, in an area of 7.32 km2.

References

Freguesias of Mangualde